This is a list of the accomplishments and records of the current Charlotte Hornets. The Hornets, known from their creation in 2004 until May 2014 as the Charlotte Bobcats, are an American professional basketball team currently playing in the National Basketball Association (NBA).

The current Hornets are the second NBA team to have played under that name. The original Hornets played in Charlotte from 1988 until moving to New Orleans in 2002; since 2013, they have been known as the New Orleans Pelicans.

Individual records

Franchise leaders 
Italic denotes still active with team.

Asterisk denotes still active but not with team.

(As of the middle of the 2022–23 season)

Individual Accomplishments and Awards

All-NBA Team

Second Team
Larry Johnson – 1993
Glen Rice – 1997

Third Team
Anthony Mason – 1997
Glen Rice – 1998
Eddie Jones – 2000
Al Jefferson – 2014
Kemba Walker – 2019

All-NBA Defensive Team

First Team
Gerald Wallace – 2010

Second Team
Anthony Mason – 1997
Eddie Jones – 1999, 2000
P.J. Brown – 2001

Executive of the Year
Bob Bass – 1997

Sixth Man of the Year
Dell Curry – 1994

Rookie of the Year
Larry Johnson – 1992
Emeka Okafor – 2005
LaMelo Ball – 2021

NBA Sportsmanship Award
Kemba Walker – 2017, 2018

NBA All-Rookie First Team
Kendall Gill – 1991
Larry Johnson – 1992
Alonzo Mourning – 1993
Emeka Okafor – 2005
 LaMelo Ball – 2021

NBA All-Rookie Second Team
Rex Chapman – 1989
J.R. Reid – 1990
Raymond Felton – 2006
Wálter Herrmann – 2007
Adam Morrison – 2007
D. J. Augustin – 2009
Michael Kidd-Gilchrist – 2013
Cody Zeller – 2014
P. J. Washington – 2020

All-Stars and All-Star Weekend participants

NBA All-Stars
 Larry Johnson – 1993, 1995
 Alonzo Mourning – 1994, 1995
 Glen Rice – 1996, 1997, 1998
 Eddie Jones – 2000
 Baron Davis – 2002
 Gerald Wallace – 2010
 Kemba Walker - 2017, 2018, 2019
 LaMelo Ball - 2022

All-Star Game MVP
Glen Rice – 1997

NBA Rising Stars Challenge
George Zidek – 1996 (East)
Baron Davis – 2001 (Sophomores)
Lee Nailon – 2002 (Sophomores)
Emeka Okafor – 2005 (Rookies)
Emeka Okafor – 2006 (Sophomores)
Adam Morrison – 2007 (Rookies)
Raymond Felton – 2007 (Sophomores)
Kemba Walker – 2012 (Team Shaq)
Michael Kidd-Gilchrist – 2013 (Team Shaq)
Kemba Walker – 2013 (Team Shaq)
Cody Zeller – 2015 (Team USA)
Frank Kaminsky – 2017 (Team USA)
P. J. Washington – 2020 (Team USA)
Miles Bridges – 2020 (Team USA)
Devonte' Graham – 2020 (Team USA)
LaMelo Ball – 2021 (Team USA)
LaMelo Ball – 2022 (Sophomores)

Slam Dunk Contest
Rex Chapman – 1990, 1991
Kendall Gill – 1991
Larry Johnson – 1992
Ricky Davis – 2000
Baron Davis – 2001
Gerald Wallace – 2010
Miles Bridges - 2019

Three-point Shootout
Dell Curry – 1992, 1994
Scott Burrell – 1995
Glen Rice – 1996, 1997, 1998
Kemba Walker – 2017

Basketball Hall of Famers

Notes

FIBA Hall of Famers

Retired numbers

The Charlotte Hornets retired Phills' number on February 9, 2000, after he was killed in an automobile accident in Charlotte. His jersey hung from the rafters of the Charlotte Coliseum until the franchise relocated in May 2002. It was displayed in the New Orleans Arena until the franchise became the Pelicans in 2013. On November 1, 2014, his jersey was returned to Charlotte, where it was re-honored and currently hangs in Spectrum Center.

Other franchise records

Team (regular season) 

 Largest margin of victory in a game –  61 (Score: 140 – 79) Mar. 22, 2018 vs. Memphis 
 Largest margin of victory in a playoffs game - 30 (Score: 119 – 89) May 3, 1993 vs. Boston Celtics 
in Eastern Conference First Round
 Biggest comeback to win a game (24 points) – 24 Oct 29, 2014 vs. Milwaukee

References

records
National Basketball Association accomplishments and records by team